Malick Mendosa, better known by his stage name S.Pri Noir, is a French rapper of Senegalese origin.

Biography 
Born to a mother from Senegal, a nursery school teacher, and a father from Guinea-Bissau, he grew up in the 18th arrondissement of Paris until the age of 12, then spent his teenage years in the Fougères district, in the 20th arrondissement of Paris.

During his teenage years, S.Pri Noir played American football in the  club, twice winning the French championship with his team. Mendosa chose S.Pri Noir to use as a screen name on MSN Messenger, and later decided to adopt it for the stage.

He set up his own label, Nouvelle École, and signed to Sony together with three other rappers: Still Fresh, Moblack and Cerebro.

Between 2008 and 2009, he joined the collective L'Institut du 75 (which later became "du 75") made up of numerous rappers including Jarod, Dr Beriz (Toxmo at the time), Abou Debeing and 1solent. He also performed on the first two volumes of À la Fuck you.

In 2013, he collaborated on the track  with 12 other rappers such as: Nekfeu, Disiz, Soprano, Sadek, Kool Shen, Akhenaton and many other artists.

In 2015, S.Pri Noir took part in the second annual , a charity concert organised by the Abbé Pierre Foundation.

He joined S&S Tour with Sneazzy from March 2018, following a concert at La Cigale in October 2017.

He released his debut album  on 11 May 2018, which sold 6,000 copies in its first week and reached number 18 on the Top Albums chart in France, featuring collaborations with artists Nekfeu, Nemir and Still Fresh. The album went gold in France in March 2019.

His second solo album, was released on 17 April 2020 and featured contributions from Leto, Alpha Wann, Sneazzy, 4Keus, Alonzo, Lefa, Laylow, Lyna Mahyem and Dadju.

Discography

Mixtapes and EP

Albums

Collaborative album 

 2012 : N.E (en collaboration avec Still Fresh)

Singles 

 2018 : Skywalker
 2018 : Highlander
 2018 : Baby Gyal
 2018 : Middle FInger
 2018 : Fusée Arianne
 2018 : Finesse (feat. Haute)
 2018 : Juste pour voir (feat. Nekfeu)
 2018 : Narco Poète
 2018 : Chico
 2018 : Papillon
 2019 : Mon Crew (feat. Nemir)
 2020 : Dystopia
 2020 : 4 litres 2
 2020 : T'as capté (feat. Alpha Wann et Sneazzy)
 2020 : Maman dort (feat. Alonzo)
 2020 : Rio Paris - Vol 447
 2020 : 911 (feat. Dadju)
 2021 : AR (feat. Gazo)
 2021 : En vrai (feat. Da Uzi)
 2021 : 7 vies (feat. RK)
 2021 : Juicy (feat. Sean)
 2021 : Hacienda
 2021 : Assermenté (feat. Mister You)
 2021 : Savage (feat. Goya)
 2021 : Sarah Connor
 2021 : Si tu savais (feat. Tayc)
 2021 : Bombay (feat. Still Fresh)

Collaborations 

 2015 : Abou Debeing feat. S.Pri Noir et Dadju - Bye Bye
 2015 : Nekfeu feat. S.Pri Noir - Ma dope (from the album Feu)
 2016 : The Shin Sekaï feat. Franglish, S.Pri Noir et Abou Debeing - Pablo Picasso (from the album Les Chroniques du Wati-Boss, Volume 3)
 2016 : The Shin Sekaï feat. Black M, S.Pri Noir et Abou Debeing - Bounce (from the album Indéfini)
 2016 : Hayce Lemsi et Volts Face feat. Abou Tall et S.Pri Noir - Célébrer (from the album À des années lumières)
 2016 : Nekfeu feat. Sneazzy et S.Pri Noir - Saturne (from the album Cyborg)
 2017 : Sianna feat. S.Pri Noir - Charbonner (from the album Diamant noir)
 2017 : Rim'K feat. S.Pri Noir - No Future (from the album Fantôme)
 2017 : Lefa feat. S.Pri Noir - Rouler (from the album Visionnaire)
 2017 : Still Fresh feat. S.Pri Noir - Demande-moi (from the album Cœur noir)
 2017 : Dadju feat. S.Pri Noir - Jenny (from the album Gentleman 2.0)
 2017 : Black M feat. S.Pri Noir - N.C.M (on the reissue of the album Éternel Insatisfait)
 2017 : Awa Imani feat. S.Pri Noir - Aime-moi
 2018 : Lefa feat. Dadju et S.Pri Noir - J'me téléporte (from the album 3 du mat)
 2018 : Dadju feat. S.Pri Noir - Jenny (on the reissue of the album Gentleman 2.0)
 2018 : 4Keus feat S.Pri Noir - Toute la night (from the album À cœur ouvert)
 2019 : Abou Debeing feat. Dadju, Franglish et S.Pri Noir - Calme (from the album Street Love)
 2019 : Abou Tall feat. S.Pri Noir - Eau de Cologne (from the album Ghetto Chic)
 2020 : Sneazzy feat. S.Pri Noir - Mon père c'est ma mère (from the album Nouvo Mode)
 2020 : Sneazzy feat. Alpha Wann, Nekfeu et S.Pri Noir - Étincelles (from the album Nouvo Mode)
 2020 : Nemir feat S.Pri Noir - Rock N' Roll (from the album Nemir)
 2020 : Lyna Mahyem feat S.Pri Noir - Code Pin 778 (from the album Femme forte)
 2020 : D.Ace feat S.Pri Noir - Charmant (from the album Vox cordis)
 2021 : Mister You feat. S.Pri Noir - La fragrance (from the album HLM 2)
 2021 : Lujipeka feat. S.Pri Noir - Putain d'époque
 2021 : Ya Levis x Leto x S.Pri Noir - YSL (sur l'EP LCLM : Prélude)

Nominations 

 2020 BET Award for Best International Act

References 

French rappers
1986 births
Rappers from Paris
Living people